The Yanjiahe Formation is a Cambrian fossiliferous geologic formation found in South China.

Fossil content 
Among others, the following fossils were found in the formation:

 Aldanella attleborensis
 Anabarites trisulcatus
 Archaeophycus yunnanensis
 Comasphaeridium annulare
 Conotheca subcurvata
 Emeiconus antiqua
 Heliosphaeridium ampliatum
 Megathrix longus
 Micrhystridium regulare
 Protoconites minor
 Purella antiqua
 Yanjiahella biscarpa
 Lapworthella sp.
 Protohertzina sp.
 Vendotaenia sp.
 Yuknessia sp.
 ?Konglingiphyton sp.

References

Bibliography

Further reading 
 J. Guo, Y. Li, and G. Li. 2014. Small shelly fossils from the early Cambrian Yanjiahe Formation, Yichang, Hubei, China. Gondwana Research 25:999-1007
 P. Chen. 1984. Discovery of Lower Cambrian small shelly fossils from Jijiapo, Yichang, west Hubei and its significance. Professional Papers of Stratigraphy and Palaeontology 13:49-64

Geologic formations of China
Cambrian System of Asia
Cambrian China
Fortunian
Shale formations
Dolomite formations
Limestone formations
Phosphorite formations
Cambrian northern paleotemperate deposits
Paleontology in Hubei